Kasimir Kaskisuo (born 2 October 1993) is a Finnish professional ice hockey goaltender for Leksands IF of the Swedish Hockey League (SHL). He has previously played for the Toronto Maple Leafs and the Nashville Predators in the National Hockey League (NHL).

Playing career

Collegiate
While playing with the Minnesota Wilderness in the North American Hockey League, Kaskisuo committed to play collegiate hockey with the University of Minnesota–Duluth. In his freshman year, Kaskisuo recorded a .923 save percentage to earn NCHC Rookie of the Week honors. He later went 5–0–0 with a .949 save percentage to earn the Bauer National Collegiate Hockey Conference Goalie of the Week. By the end of the month, he was named Hockey Commissioners' Association Rookie of the Month for November. At the conclusion of the 2014–15 season, Kaskisuo was named to the All-Rookie Team, and a finalist for Goaltender of the Year. He was also elected the University of Minnesota–Duluth's Most Valuable Player for the 2014–15 season.

Prior to his sophomore season, Kaskisuo was named to the Mike Richter Award Watch List for the 2015–16 season. At the conclusion of the season, Kaskisuo was chosen for the American Sports Network Player of the Week after making a career-high 49 saves in a game against St. Cloud State University. He was also named a finalist for the Mike Richter Award as the most outstanding in Division I NCAA men's ice hockey.

Professional
On 28 March 2016, Kaskisuo signed a two-way contract with the Toronto Maple Leafs, and began play with its minor league affiliates, the Toronto Marlies of the American Hockey League (AHL) and the Orlando Solar Bears of the ECHL. On 29 May 2018, the Maple Leafs signed Kaskisuo to another two-way contract that lasted two years. During the 2017–18 season, the Maple Leafs loaned Kaskisuo to the AHL's Chicago Wolves.

On 12 November 2019, the Maple Leafs called-up Kaskisuo to serve as their backup goaltender. On 16 November 2019, he made his NHL debut with the Maple Leafs against the Pittsburgh Penguins in a 6-1 loss in Pittsburgh.

In the summer of 2020, the Maple Leafs hosted one of the two "bubbles" where the NHL held the 2020 Stanley Cup playoffs. Each team had to choose a third goaltender in case of emergency, and the Maple Leafs chose Kaskisuo.

On 13 October 2020, after five seasons with the Maple Leafs organization, Kaskisuo signed a one-year, two-way contract with the Nashville Predators as a free agent.

Following his sixth professional season within North America, Kaskisuo opted to return to Europe as a free agent, agreeing to a two-year contract with Swedish SHL club, Leksands IF, on 4 June 2021.

Personal life

Kaskisuo met his wife Whitney while in college. They have one daughter together. Kaskisuo also runs a YouTube channel in which he discusses life as a professional hockey player and his life experiences. As of November 2022, Kaskisuo's channel has 45 800 subscribers and over 4 million views. The channel has been active since 2020.

Career statistics

Awards and honors

References

External links
 

1993 births
Chicago Wolves players
Finnish ice hockey goaltenders
Leksands IF players
Living people
Minnesota Duluth Bulldogs men's ice hockey players
Nashville Predators players
Orlando Solar Bears (ECHL) players
Sportspeople from Vantaa
Toronto Maple Leafs players
Toronto Marlies players
Undrafted National Hockey League players